Bogdański is a Polish surname. It comes from the given name Bogdan.

Notable people having that surname include:
Ed Bogdanski (1921–1989), basketball player
Jack Bogdanski (fl. 1970s–2010s), professor of law at Lewis & Clark Law School in Portland, Oregon
Jezdimir Bogdanski (1930–2007), a Macedonian politician and a participant in the National Liberation War
Joseph Bogdanski (1911–1997), a Chief Justice of the Connecticut Supreme Court
Renata Bogdańska (1920–2010), stage name of Irena Anders, Polish actress and singer
Sammi Bogdanski, original keyboardist for the band Black Lungs

Polish-language surnames